Ri Jong-song (born 27 January 1982) is a North Korean gymnast. He competed at the 2004 Summer Olympics.

References

External links
 

1982 births
Living people
North Korean male artistic gymnasts
Olympic gymnasts of North Korea
Gymnasts at the 2004 Summer Olympics
Place of birth missing (living people)
Gymnasts at the 2006 Asian Games
Asian Games competitors for North Korea
21st-century North Korean people